The University of Bremen (German: Universität Bremen) is a public university in Bremen, Germany, with approximately 23,500 people from 115 countries. It is one of 11 institutions which were successful in the category "Institutional Strategies" of the Excellence Initiative launched by the Federal Government and the Federal States in 2012. The university was also successful in the categories "Graduate Schools" and "Clusters of Excellence" of the initiative.

Some of the paths that were taken in the early days of the university, also referred to as the "Bremen model", have since become characteristics of modern universities, such as interdisciplinary, explorative learning, social relevance to practice-oriented project studies which enjoy a high reputation in the academic world as well as in business and industry.

History

Though Bremen became a university city only recently, higher education in Bremen has a long tradition. The Bremen Latin School was upgraded to "Gymnasium Academicum" in 1584. In 1610 it was transformed into "Gymnasium Illustre". Under Napoleonic rule, in 1811 the institution of a "French-Bremen University" was considered. In 1971 the University of Bremen opened its doors.

The development of the University of Bremen can be divided up into steps of 10 to 12 years – first foundation, then restructuring, consolidation and profile building. At the beginning of the 1970s, the university was set up as a "science complex" in a city oriented towards trade and seafaring that had no experience with academia, particularly not with leftist professors. University, business and the public in the region did not move closer together until the 1980s, through the foundation of the natural science and engineering departments, co-operation with the newly founded Alfred Wegener Institute for Polar and Marine Research in Bremerhaven (1980), as well as the development of the co-located technology park (from 1988). Other important factors were the initial success in setting up collaborative research centres and in the acquisition of considerable of external funds. The mathematics professor Jürgen Timm, elected university rector in 1982, was largely responsible for this turnaround.

As a consequence, the University of Bremen improved in research rankings, gained national recognition, and established a number of endowment professorships. Research excellence and its interdisciplinary profile is reflected in the establishment of numerous research centers and programs funded by the German Research Foundation (DFG). These currently include eight collaborative research centers and the Research Center of Ocean Margins, one of only six national research centers of the DFG.

From 1996 until 2001 the University of Bremen (along with six other universities in Germany) participated in a pilot scheme for structural reform of university administration, funded by the Volkswagen Foundation. This project improved the co-operation and communication between the university's administration, teaching and research units. With the realization of the "Laptop University" project, the University of Bremen became a leading university in the field of digital media education in Germany.

By 2000, after an organisational development process of three years in which the university set goals for the development of its profile, this trend was continued with the promotion of junior scientists in structured graduate programs, and staff development programs for the great number of early-stage researchers entering the university as junior professors. In teaching, there are comprehensive evaluations, more specific admission requirements, and improved completion rates for Bachelors and master's degrees.

Bremen was rewarded with the title "Stadt der Wissenschaft 2005" (City of Science of 2005), which science, politics, business and culture won jointly for Bremen and Bremerhaven, by the Foundation for German Science (Stifterverband für die Deutsche Wissenschaft).

Faculties
These are the twelve faculties into which the university is divided:
 Faculty 1: Physics/Electrical Engineering
 Faculty 2: Biology/Chemistry
 Faculty 3: Mathematics/Computer Science
 Faculty 4: Production Engineering – Mechanical Engineering & Process Engineering
 Faculty 5: Geosciences
 Faculty 6: Law
 Faculty 7: Business Studies and Economics
 Faculty 8: Social Sciences
 Faculty 9: Cultural Studies
 Faculty 10: Languages and Literary Studies
 Faculty 11: Human and Health Sciences
 Faculty 12: Pedagogy and Educational Sciences

Academics

Admission 
Admission to University of Bremen is highly competitive with big differences in the admission rates between programs. In the winter term 2017 the overall undergraduate admission rate was 16.2% with 24,000 applications for 3,900 places.

Teaching and learning 
The University of Bremen is a campus university which offers 118 different programs. In 2016 it granted 2,028 baccalaureate degrees, 1,357 master's degrees, 303 doctoral degrees. Each year the University of Bremen awards the Berninghausen Prize for excellent teaching. The prize was started in 1992 and is considered to be the oldest teaching award at any German university. Tuition is free for national and international students at the University of Bremen. There is, however, a semester contribution of approx. €300, which includes a ticket for public transportation in Bremen and parts of Lower Saxony.

Research 
The University of Bremen is a research university. It has 12 faculties, but focuses its research on 6 interdisciplinary high-profile areas. They are (1) marine, polar and climate research, (2) social change, social policy, and the state, (3) materials science and production engineering, (4) minds media machines (5) logistics and (6) health sciences.

Scientific focus 

 Marine, polar and climate research
 Social change, social policy and the state
 Materials science and its technologies
 Minds, media, machines
 Logistics
 Health sciences

With interdisciplinary scientific focal points, the University of Bremen has three ongoing DFG-funded Collaborative Research Centers ("Sonderforschungsbereiche" (SFB)) and is involved in two other SFBs.

The Oceans in the Earth System (MARUM) Cluster of Excellence developed in 2007 from the DFG Research Center Ocean Margins, which was founded in 2001.

Collaborative research centers 
The university has as of May 2021 the following SFBs:

 SFB 1320: Everyday Activity Science and Engineering (EASE) (2017–)
 SFB 1232: From Colored States to Evolutionary Construction Materials (2016–) (2016–)
 TRR 136: Function-oriented Manufacturing based on Characteristic Process Signatures (2014–)
 SFB 747: Micro Cold Forming – Processes, Characterization, Optimization (2007–)
SFB 1342: The Global Dynamics of Social Policy (2018-)

The University of Bremen is also involved in the following special research areas:

 TRR 172: Artic Amplification: Climate Relevant Atmospheric and Surface Processes, and Feedback Mechanisms (AC)³ (2016–)
 TRR 181: Energy transfer in the atmosphere and in the ocean (2016–)

Past SFBs:

 SFB 597: CRC 597: Changing Statehood (2003–2014)
 SFB/TR8: Spatial Cognition – Inference, Action, Interaction (2003– 2014) (2003– 2014)
 SFB 637: Self-control of logistic processes (2004–2012) 
 SFB/TR4: Process chains for the replication of complex optical components (2001–2012)
 SFB 570: Distortion Engineering – Warp control in manufacturing (2001–2011) 
 SFB 517: Neural Basics of Cognitive Performance (1996–2005) 
 SFB 372: Spray compacting (1994–2004)

Rankings

Notable alumni
 Hans Koenigsmann, a German aerospace engineer, best known for his work on SpaceX.
 Michael Kölling, a German computer scientist, currently working at King's College London, best known for the development of BlueJ.
Sarah Ryglewski, a German politician (SPD) serves since 8 December 2021 as Minister of State for Federal-State Relations in the first Scholz cabinet.

See also

 Bremen Institute for Applied Beam Technology
 Center of Applied Space Technology and Microgravity
 Fallturm Bremen
 List of colleges and universities

Notes and references

External links
 University of Bremen Website 

 
Educational institutions established in 1971
1971 establishments in Germany